Adriana is a genus of shrubs in the family Euphorbiaceae, first described as a genus in 1825. The entire genus is endemic to Australia.

Species
 Adriana quadripartita (Labill.) Mull.Arg. - South Australia, Victoria, southern Western Australia
Adriana tomentosa Gaudich.- All mainland states
 Adriana urticoides (A.Cunn.) Guymer ex P.I.Forst. - Northern Territory plus all states except Tasmania

The genus name of Adriana is in honour of Adrien-Henri de Jussieu (1797–1853), a French botanist.

References

Acalypheae
Malpighiales of Australia
Endemic flora of Australia
Plants described in 1825